Kabelvåg is a village in Vågan Municipality in Nordland county, Norway. It is located on the southern shore of the island of Austvågøya in the Lofoten archipelago.

The village was founded as "Vågan" in the early 12th century by King Øystein Magnusson, who built a church and a fishermen's hostel there.  According to the Heimskringla, there was something resembling a town there several centuries earlier — the first known town in North Norway, known as "Vågar".

There are several attractions in Kabelvåg: the Lofoten Museum, Lofoten Aquarium, and Espolin Gallery. Vågan Church (also known as the Lofoten Cathedral) is located in Kabelvåg. The European route E10 highway runs through the village.

The education sector includes a college for film and other art forms: Nordland kunst- og filmhøgskole (NKFS).

History
The oldest traces of settlement in Kabelvåg are from the late Stone Age, with possible traces of human activity going as far back as the early Stone Age. There are only sparse traces of settlements in the area now known as Kabelvåg during the Iron Age.

A couple 
of kilometers west of the present-day center of Kabelvåg, Vágar existed as a city between 1000 and 1400. It was Northern Norway's first city. During the Middle Ages the settlement known as Vågan experienced a rise in importance. This happens mostly because of the seasonal fishing, "Lofotfisket", which mostly takes part in an area of the sea known as Hølla, located between modern day Kabelvåg, Svolvær, and Skrova.

Lofotfiske 
The Lofoten is the spawning grounds for the northern Atlantic cod. When spawning season begins, it creates an extreme increase in the activity of the fishing industry. A result of the "Lofotfiske" event, a great need for storage arises, as the fish is processed and cured in large amounts.  This led to the drying and salting of fish. Due to the special weather of the Lofoten islands, it is an ideal place to make the product known as tørrfisk.

During the Middle Ages, dried fish became a very important commodity in the Catholic countries of Southern Europe, and the backbone of the local economy. According to historians, dried cod from Nordland in the 13th century accounted for 80 percent of all of Norway's exports.

Notable residents
Thor Erdahl, a Norwegian painter
Stig Johansen, a Norwegian footballer

References

External links
Lofoten Aquarium
History from a commercial tourist site

Villages in Nordland
Vågan
Populated places of Arctic Norway